Dębiec is a historical southern part of Poznań, Poland.

It was incorporated into the city limits in 1925. The Dębiec area borders with Luboń in the south, Świerczewo in the west, Starołęka, and the Warta river in the east, extending up to the north to the railway tracks between the Poznań-Górczyn and Poznań-Główny stations and to Wspólna street where it borders with Wilda.

In the late 18th Century, a fairly large number of Bambers settled in what was then a village and assimilated with the local population. After World War II it became the main area of housing for the workers of the Cegielski factories.

References

Neighbourhoods of Poznań